Crowding-in is a phenomenon that occurs when higher government spending leads to an increase in economic growth and therefore encourages firms to invest due to the presence of more profitable investment opportunities. The crowding-in effect is observed when there is an increase in private investment due to increased public investment, for example, through the construction or improvement of physical infrastructures such as roads, highways, water and sanitation, ports, airports, railways, etc.  According to Post – Keynesian macroeconomics views , in a modern economy operating below capacity, government borrowings can increase demand by generating employment, thereby encouraging private investment, thus leading to crowding-in.

History 
During the period when Keynesian economics prevailed, crowding-out was always at the center of policy debates despite differences in evaluation perspectives. Aschauer (1989) suggested the possibility that government investment may induce private investment, directing his attention to increases in the productivity of private capital resulting from the accumulation of public capital through public investment. Aschauer raised the possibility that an active fiscal policy may have a crowding-in effect through the productivity effect of public capital (investment). In Aschauer's model, public investment affects private investment largely through the two routes. One is through the negative effect of government investment that appears in the private investment function, and this effect is mainly composed of the so-called crowding-out effect. The other is the positive effect that appears in the profit function through the productivity effect of public capital, which is called the crowding-in effect. The crowding-in theory has gained popularity during the great recession of 2007-2009. During that time, huge spending on the part of the federal government on bonds and other securities had reduced interest rates.

Crowding-in effect and monetary policy 

Government can control the level of economic activities by making changes in monetary policy. Monetary policy may be expansionary or contractionary depending on the prevailing economic condition. The IS-LM model can be used to depict the effect of tight monetary policies. In the LM curve, equilibrium points shift in the market for two reasons: changes in money supply and changes in money demand. A decrease in the money supply shifts the LM curve to the left and an increment in supply shifts the curve to the right. When the economy is in a slowdown, the government uses its Central Bank to implement an expansionary monetary policy to help the economy recover. The LM curve shifts to the right as the money supply grows, resulting in a decrease in the rate of interest. At a lower interest rate private investment increases. More investment causes aggregate demand and income to rise. As a result, the economy shifts from equilibrium point, and with this the rate of interest declines from i1 to i2 and national income raises from Y1to Y2. Expansionary monetary policy boosts economic growth by lowering interest rates. It i's effective in adding more liquidity in a recession.

Determinants of government expenditure effects 
Crowding is more likely to occur in transitional or developing countries. In case of recession, there is unused private sector savings and production capacity (unemployed labor force, unused capital infrastructure, etc.). An increment in government expenditure significantly increases national income in developing countries due to the presence of relatively higher levels of unemployment factors of production. This increase in national income further increases the purchasing capacity and encourages the growth of private investment. At the same time, an increase in the budget deficit will have a very small influence on interest rate growth because of the high elasticity of speculative demand for money (horizontal LM curve). In transitional countries, national income is the most important factor influencing private influencing the private investment. The impact of the interest rate is much smaller.

Expansionary fiscal policy  
Keynesian economic theory suggests that expansionary fiscal policy along with a monetary policy is an effective tool to overcome recession. During times of recession, there is a downfall in aggregate demand as consumer spending and private investment decrease. A downfall in consumer demand leads to a decrement in private investment which further depresses demands. An expansionary fiscal policy has two fundamental tools: Tax cuts and increased government spending. Changes in any of these cause a shift in the aggregate demand curve. Expansionary fiscal policy is used to push the economy during a recession. Government spending and tax cut are components of aggregate demand; an, an increase in government spending along with the tax cuts will shift the aggregate demand (AD) curve to the right for an economy. The extent of this shift in the AD curve thoroughly depends upon the size of the government spending multiplier.

The American Recovery and Reinvestment Act of 2009 is an example of government spending as an expansionary fiscal policy. This $831 billion effort was undertaken during the Great Recession. The majority of this money went toward infrastructure, education, and unemployment benefits extensions.

Difference between crowding-out and crowding-in effect 
Paul Krugman along with the majority of Neo-Keynesian economists argues that economic stimulus should be in the form of expenditure, not in the form of a tax deduction (excluding the poorest inhabitants) because the one part of tax deduction will be retained but not consumed (cite). The effects of different parts of government spending (public sector financing, public investments, and transfer payments) are very different. Government expenditure changes in size and structure can have a variety of effects on economic growth.

The crowding-out effect of government spending on private investment shows itself either directly or indirectly. Indirect crowding-out takes place through an increase in interest rates and prices, but direct crowding-out occurs with the reduction of the physical resources available to the private sector. In case private expenditure doesn't decline with an increase in government expenditure, the crowding expenditure crowding out effect is zero.

The crowding-in effect is more likely to occur due to the income effect of high public investment which leads to an increment in private investment. In crowding-in effect, a rise in private investment due to a rise in government investment is more effective.

Factors responsible for crowding in effect 

 Recession and crowding-in – During a recession, the government tax cut increases increase aggregate demand, as people pay lower taxes they have a surplus to spend which increases demands. This rise in demand leads to more employment opportunities and crowding in businesses. Keynes's economic theories suggest a recession as the private sector has idle resources due to more savings. Therefore, government borrowing is effectively making use of these idle resources.
 High multiplier effect – The multiplier effect here refers to the relationship between government spending and total national income. The multiplier's size is proportional to the marginal propensity to consume (MPC), which is the proportion of an increase in income spent on consumption. Because of the high multiplier effect, spending rises, resulting in crowding in.
 Liquidity trap – In case of lower interest rates and fall in prices, higher government borrowing is unable to push the interest rates. The government can end a liquidity trap through an increase in government spending. It also directly reduces unemployment. In a situation of deflation, real interest rates (nominal rates -inflation) may be quite high. As public spending reduces deflation, it may help to reduce real interest rates and therefore increase private sector investment.

Limitation of crowding-in effect 
Government adopts an expansionary fiscal policy stance in times of high unemployment and recession to boost economic activity. This causes an increment in aggregate demand and encourages private sector investment. But, crowding in will be limited in effect. When an economy is in recession and producing less than its potential GDP, expansionary fiscal policy is most appropriate. However, as soon as the economy returns to its long-run growth and is producing above its potential GDP, this increases interest rates which results in a reduced investment. In the case of a strong economic recovery, the rate of inflation is high. Rising inflation rates induce banks to increase interest rates. As soon as interest rates increase investment rate declines further leading to a decrease in the crowding-in effect.

References 

Economic policy
Economic growth